Hisham al-Hayali (died 18 August 2012) was governor of Iraq's Diyala Governorate from March to August 2012 when he was killed in a car crash. His wife, former MP Tayseer al-Mashhadani, died in the same crash. Their funeral was conducted on August 19, 2012, at 10 am.

References

2012 deaths
Governors of Diyala Province
People from Diyala Province
Road incident deaths in Iraq
Year of birth missing